The Chukchi Peninsula tundra ecoregion (WWF ID: PA1104) is an ecoregion that covers the northern coast of Russia along the East Siberian Sea, a marginal sea of the Arctic Ocean. The climate is somewhat milder than would be expected for its latitude, but the moderating effects of the East Siberian Sea and Bering Sea permits summer daytime temperatures above . Many colonies of migrating birds visit the area. The ecoregion is in the Palearctic realm, and tundra biome.

Location and description 
The ecoregion stretches 700 km from the mouth of the Lena River in the northwest to the eastern tip of the Chukchi Peninsula in the east.  The terrain is mostly treeless Arctic plains on alluvial deposits and widespread groundwater saturation.  There are some small mountains reaching up to 1,000 meters.

Climate 
The region has a Tundra (Koppen classification ET).

Flora and fauna 
The ecoregion lies north of the treeline, with only scattered communities of brush among the widespread tundra floral cover.  Over 400 species of lichen and moss have been recorded.

Protections 
Beringia National Park is a significant nationally protected area in this ecoregion.

See also 
 List of ecoregions in Russia
 East Siberian Mountains

References 

Ecoregions of Russia
Palearctic ecoregions
Tundra ecoregions